Tarabini is a surname. Notable people with the surname include:

Aníbal Tarabini (1941–1997), Argentine footballer
Ayelén Tarabini (born 1992), Argentine artistic gymnast
Eugenio Tarabini (1930–2018), Italian politician
Patricia Tarabini (born 1968), Argentine tennis player